This is a list of defunct airlines of Malaysia, including British Borneo.

See also
 List of airlines of Malaysia
 List of airports in Malaysia

References

Malaysia
Airlines
Airlines, defunct